Next of Kihn is a 1978 studio album by American singer-songwriter Greg Kihn. It was the third and last album to be released under the name Greg Kihn before the group changed into The Greg Kihn Band in 1979.

Next of Kihn has a notable darker sound than its predecessors and features longer and more complex compositions. The album's centerpiece "Remember" was recorded live in one single take.

Track listing

Charts

Personnel
Greg Kihn - guitar, vocals
Dave Carpender - guitar, vocals
Larry Lynch - drums, vocals
Steve Wright - bass, vocals

Production
Producers: Glen Coloktin, Matthew King Kaufman, Gary Phillips
Engineers: Glen Coloktin, Tom Lubin
Mastering: George Horn
Art direction: Barbara Mendez
Artwork/Design: Michael Zagaris

References

1978 albums
Greg Kihn albums
Beserkley Records albums